Tsz Tong Tsuen, also transliterated as Chi Tong Tsuen, is a village in the Kam Tin area of Yuen Long District, Hong Kong.

Administration
Chi Tong Tsuen is a recognized village under the New Territories Small House Policy.

References

External links

 Delineation of area of existing village Tsz Tong Tsuen (Kam Tin) for election of resident representative (2019 to 2022)
 Antiquities Advisory Board. Historic Building Appraisal. Residence of Tang Pak Kau, No. 20 Tsz Tong Tsuen, Kam Tin Pictures
 Antiquities Advisory Board. Historic Building Appraisal. Tang Lung Yau Wan Tsuen Um Ancestral Hall, No. 57 Tsz Tong Tsuen, Kam Tin Pictures

Villages in Yuen Long District, Hong Kong
Kam Tin